Paraphysodeutera is a genus of beetles in the family Cicindelidae, containing the following species:

 Paraphysodeutera kamilmoraveci J. Moravec, 2004
 Paraphysodeutera naviauxi J. Moravec, 2002

References

Cicindelidae